Kristine Austgulen (born 4 November 1980) is a former Norwegian female basketball player.

Virginia Commonwealth University statistics

Source

Reference

1980 births
Living people
Norwegian women's basketball players
Forwards (basketball)
Sportspeople from Bergen
VCU Rams women's basketball players